Shah Dhar (Dari/Pashto/) is a mountain in the Hindu Kush mountains. Shah Dhar is at a distance of 337 km  from Islam, Abad.

See also
 List of mountains by elevation
 List of Ultras of the Karakoram and Hindu Kush

References

Mountains of Afghanistan
Mountains of Khyber Pakhtunkhwa
International mountains of Asia
Afghanistan–Pakistan border
Seven-thousanders of the Hindu Kush
Wakhan
Landforms of Badakhshan Province